The Poudingue de Vihiers is a geologic formation in France. It preserves fossils dating back to the Cambrian period.

See also

 List of fossiliferous stratigraphic units in France

References
 

Cambrian System of Europe
Cambrian France